Nicolas Launay is an English record producer, composer and recording engineer. He is one of the most sought after record producers in the world due to his success with recent albums by Nick Cave and the Bad Seeds, Anna Calvi, IDLES, Black Rebel Motorcycle Club, Yeah Yeah Yeahs and Arcade Fire. Noted for his flamboyant style he is among the most successful producers of the post-punk era, helming records from pivotal acts including Public Image Ltd, Gang of Four, Killing Joke, The Birthday Party, and The Slits.

Launay is known primarily for his passionate approach to recording with emphasis on raw sounds and capturing mood. Other artists he has worked with include: Kate Bush, Talking Heads, David Byrne, INXS, Models, Midnight Oil, Grinderman, Lou Reed, The Veils, Anna Calvi, Supergrass, The Living End, Band of Skulls, Silverchair and IDLES. He lives in Hollywood, United States and travels to London frequently. More recent work includes producing Yeah Yeah Yeahs' Mosquito, It's Blitz!, mixing Arcade Fire's Neon Bible and The Suburbs, and producing and recording Nick Cave and the Bad Seeds' Push the Sky Away, Skeleton Tree along with Grinderman and Grinderman 2.

Nick Launay is also known for setting trends by finding lesser known Recording Studios in the world and making them popular. A few years ago he encouraged Nick Cave and the Bad Seeds to take a leap of faith and record what became the Push the Sky Away album at a little known studio in France called La Fabrique. At the time no foreign band had worked there. Since then Morrissey, Radiohead, and Foals have all followed suit. Similarly with La Frette studios he produced Skeleton Tree and then recommended it to Arctic Monkeys via Domino Recording Company owner Laurence Bell. Alex Turner now records all his projects there, and others have followed.

Biography

Background
The son of French author André Launay and fashion model Eve Launay, he was born in London, England and moved with his family to the village of Frigiliana in Spain at age eight, where his parents adopted a bohemian lifestyle.

The family returned to England in 1976, where Launay developed a love of punk rock.

Career
In 1978, he began working at Tape One studios on Tottenham Court Road, where he was trained to edit hit songs for K-tel Top 20 compilation albums, reducing their length to 2½ minutes in order to fit 20 songs on one album. He recalled: "The trick was to keep all the good bits that people would recognise."

According to his website, Launay was late at work one night "frantically editing and reconstructing an experimental version of "Pop Muzik" by UK pop band M, for his own amusement, when he was visited by respected mastering engineer Denis Blackham." Blackham was so impressed with the new extended version, he played it the next day to M's Robin Scott. Launay says his version was released as a 12-inch single and became a Top 10 hit in the UK and other countries.

In 1980, Launay moved to Virgin Records’ Townhouse studios, where he worked as an assistant engineer on albums including The Jam’s Sound Affects and XTC’s Black Sea, assisting producers John Leckie, Tony Visconti, Steve Lillywhite and Hugh Padgham.

In 1981, as the most junior member assistant engineer, he was conscripted to work on a Public Image Ltd recording session for a single, "Home is Where the Heart is".  In a PiL fansite interview  Launay recalled: 

Days later Launay was told PiL wanted him to mix a new song they had worked on. He was asked by the Townhouse manager whether he had done a mix before. "I remember lying and saying, 'Yes of course I have," he said. "She told me I would have to work alone, as no other assistant would do it. Once again I couldn't believe my luck."

Launay co-produced the band's The Flowers of Romance album (1981), which brought praise for its sonic oddities and prompted other bands including Killing Joke, The Slits, The Birthday Party and Gang of Four to collaborate with him in the studio.

He worked for two months as engineer on Kate Bush’s self-produced The Dreaming (1982), about which he remembers:

He worked with producer Colin Newman of Wire on the Virgin Prunes’ If I Die I Die (1982) before securing his first major production role on the fifth album by Midnight Oil, 10, 9, 8, 7, 6, 5, 4, 3, 2, 1 (1982).

Production technique

Asked in the Mix interview for his formula for making a record, he said he usually went into rehearsals for about two weeks, experimenting with songs and arranging them in different ways, but with "strong, solid ideas" about how the songs should be arranged. After about two weeks' work, he enters the studio with the band:

Production credits

 1980: "Heart of Darkness" by Positive Noise
 1981: "Flowers of Romance" single by Public Image Ltd
 1981: The Flowers of Romance by Public Image Ltd
 1981: "Follow the Leaders" single by Killing Joke
 1981: What's THIS For...! by Killing Joke
 1981: "To Hell with Poverty!" single by Gang of Four
 1981: "Release the Bats" single by The Birthday Party
 1981: "Earthbeat" single by The Slits
 1982: "Empire Song" single by Killing Joke
 1982: "Pagan Lovesong" by Virgin Prunes
 1982: Junkyard by The Birthday Party
 1982: 10, 9, 8, 7, 6, 5, 4, 3, 2, 1 by Midnight Oil
 1983: Seance by The Church
 1983: The Pleasure of Your Company by Models
 1983: Grapes of Wrath by Spear of Destiny
 1984: Red Sails in the Sunset by Midnight Oil
 1984: The Swing by INXS
 1985: Big Canoe by Tim Finn
 1985: Out of Mind, Out of Sight by Models
 1985: Over the Rainbow by Virgin Prunes
 1985: Waiting for the Floods by The Armoury Show 
 1988: Bonk by Big Pig 
 1991: Honeychild (album) by Jenny Morris
 1992: Sand in the Vaseline: Popular Favorites by Talking Heads
"Popsicle", "Gangster of Love", "Lifetime Piling Up"
 1992: Uh-Oh by David Byrne 
 1993: Earth and Sun and Moon by Midnight Oil
 1994: Peach by The Lupins
 1995: Example by For Squirrels 
 1996: Amazing Disgrace by The Posies
 1997: Freak Show by Silverchair
 1997: Transmitter by Automatic
 1997: Never Bet the Devil Your Head by Subrosa
 1998: Feeling Strangely Fine by Semisonic
 1998: Freak*on*ica by Girls Against Boys
 1998: Vicious Precious (EP) by Primary
 1999: Neon Ballroom by Silverchair
 1999: Chronicle Kings by Earth to Andy
 2000: Consent to Treatment by Blue October
 2000: Stereodreamscene by Deckard 
 2001: Roll On by The Living End 
 2002: Androgynous Jesus by Must 
 2003: Nocturama by Nick Cave and the Bad Seeds
 2003: The Art of Losing by American Hi-Fi
 2004: Aiming for Your Head by Betchadupa
 2004: Abattoir Blues/The Lyre of Orpheus by Nick Cave and the Bad Seeds
 2006: Nux Vomica by The Veils
 2006: State of Emergency by The Living End
 2007: Young Modern by Silverchair
 2007: Grinderman by Grinderman
 2007: Welcome the Night by The Ataris
 2007: Is Is by Yeah Yeah Yeahs
 2008: Diamond Hoo Ha by Supergrass
 2008: Dig, Lazarus, Dig!!! by Nick Cave and the Bad Seeds
 2009: It's Blitz! by Yeah Yeah Yeahs 
 2009: Quicken the Heart by Maxïmo Park
 2009: Ignore the Ignorant by The Cribs
 2010: Grinderman 2 by Grinderman
 2011: Ornaments from the Silver Arcade by Young Knives
 2013: Push the Sky Away by Nick Cave and The Bad Seeds
 2013: Mosquito by Yeah Yeah Yeahs 
 2014: Himalayan by Band of Skulls
 2015: Coming Forth by Day by Cassandra Wilson
 2015: Freedom by Refused
 2016: Skeleton Tree by Nick Cave and The Bad Seeds
 2018: Wrong Creatures by Black Rebel Motorcycle Club
 2018: Hunter by Anna Calvi
 2018: Joy as an act of resistance by IDLES
 2019: Scatter the Rats by L7
 2019: Ride Again by Shakespeare's Sister
 2019: Devour You by Starcrawler

Mix/Recording credits

 1981: The Dreaming by Kate Bush
 1981: Face Value by Phil Collins
 1985: Behind the Sun by Eric Clapton
 1990: Suicide Blonde 12" by INXS
 2004: A Song Is a City by Eskimo Joe
 2005: Animal Serenade by Lou Reed
 2007: Neon Bible by Arcade Fire
 2008: Twenty One by Mystery Jets
 2010: The Suburbs by Arcade Fire
 2018: Joy as an Act of Resistance by IDLES
 2019: Peek by CRX

Filmography
 Plush (2013)

ARIA Music Awards
The ARIA Music Awards is an annual awards ceremony that recognises excellence, innovation, and achievement across all genres of Australian music. They commenced in 1987.

! 
|-
|1997
| Nick Launay for Freak Show by Silverchair
| ARIA Award for Producer of the Year
| 
|
|-
|1998
| Nick Launay for "The Door" by Silverchair
| ARIA Award for Engineer of the Year
| 
|
|-
|rowspan="2"|1999
|rowspan="2"| Nick Launay for "Supposed to Be Here", "24000", "This Is the Sound" and "Come to Take You Home" by Primary and Neon Ballroom by Silverchair
| Producer of the Year
| 
|rowspan="2"|
|-
| Engineer of the Year
| 
|-
|rowspan="2"|2001
|rowspan="2"| Nick Launay for Roll On by The Living End
| Producer of the Year
| 
|rowspan="2"|
|-
| Engineer of the Year
| 
|-
|rowspan="2"|2006
|rowspan="2"| Nick Launay for State of Emergency by The Living End
| Producer of the Year
| 
|rowspan="2"|
|-
| Engineer of the Year
| 
|-

References

External links
 Official site
 Interview, HitQuarters Nov 2009

1960s births
Living people
ARIA Award winners
English audio engineers
English record producers
People from Hammersmith
English people of French descent
English expatriates in Spain